Desert Ridge may refer to:

 Desert Ridge planned community in Phoenix, Arizona
 Desert Ridge Marketplace, shopping mall in Phoenix, Arizona
 Desert Ridge High School in Mesa, Arizona
 Desert Ridge Junior High School, also in Mesa, Arizona
 Desert Ridge Middle School in Albuquerque, New Mexico